Tiwaripotamon is a genus of freshwater crabs, recorded from China and Vietnam.

Species
 Tiwaripotamon annamense (Balss, 1914)
 Tiwaripotamon araneum (Rathbun, 1904)
 Tiwaripotamon austenianum (Wood-Mason, 1871)
 Tiwaripotamon edostilus Ng & Yeo, 2001
 Tiwaripotamon pingguoense Dai & Naiyanetr, 1994
 Tiwaripotamon vietnamicum (Dang & Hô, 2002)
 Tiwaripotamon vixuyenense Shih & Do, 2014
 Tiwaripotamon xiurenense Dai & Naiyanetr, 1994

References

External links

Potamoidea
Freshwater crustaceans of Asia